Kokhav HaShahar (also spelt Kochav Shachar and Kochav HaShachar, trans. Morning Star) is an Israeli settlement in the northern West Bank, organized as a community settlement in the Binyamin region. Located on a mountain ridge overlooking the Jordan Valley and accessible via the Allon Road, it falls under the municipal jurisdiction of Mateh Binyamin Regional Council.

The international community considers Israeli settlements in the West Bank illegal under international law.

History
Kokhav HaShahar was founded by nine young couples in 1979 on the site of an Israel Defense Forces outpost

According to the Palestinian NGO ARIJ, Israel confiscated land from two villages in order to build Kokhav HaShahar:

1,264 dunams from Deir Jarir,
433 dunams from Kafr Malik.

International NGOs allege that the villages of Deir Jarir and Kafr Malik annexed these lands from privately owned Jewish landowners during the Jordanian rule in the years 1948 - 1967 and Israel therefore took back these lands following the 1967 war.

Near Kokhav HaShahar is a site of one of many quarries operated by Israeli companies in the West Bank. Yesh Din legal counsel Michael Sfard said that "according to international law, so long as the West Bank is not annexed to Israel, it is forbidden for Israel to exploit the natural resources there for non-security related purposes." Sfard also stated that 74% of the gravel mined from these quarries is used for construction inside Israel, and that that means the existence of the quarries does not violate international law.

Maoz Esther outpost
Maoz Esther, north of Kokhav HaShahar and east of Ramallah, was an outpost established in 2005 by Kokhav HaShahar residents in memory of Ester Galia of Kokhav HaShahar, who was murdered at Rimonim junction by Palestinian terrorists. The Israel Police destroyed the settlement's seven huts in May 2009. Since then, settlers have repeatedly rebuilt the outpost, and police have each time removed the huts.

Mitzpe Kramim outpost

Ma'ale Shlomo outpost

References

External links

Religious Israeli settlements
Populated places established in 1979
Mateh Binyamin Regional Council
1979 establishments in the Israeli Military Governorate
Community settlements
Israeli settlements in the West Bank